Conasprella memiae, common name Memi's cone, is a species of sea snail, a marine gastropod mollusk in the family Conidae, the cone snails and their allies.

Like all species within the genus Conasprella, these snails are predatory and venomous. They are capable of "stinging" humans, therefore live ones should be handled carefully or not at all.

Description
The size of the shell varies between 11 mm and 33 mm.

Distribution
This marine species occurs off Japan, Indonesia and the Fiji Islands.

References

 Habe, T. and Kosuge, S. 1970c. Descriptions of two new species of cone shell from the Philippines and Taiwan. Venus 29(3):81–83, pl. 5. 
 Puillandre N., Duda T.F., Meyer C., Olivera B.M. & Bouchet P. (2015). One, four or 100 genera? A new classification of the cone snails. Journal of Molluscan Studies. 81: 1–23

Gallery
Below are several color forms:

External links
 The Conus Biodiversity website
 Cone Shells – Knights of the Sea
 
 Specimen at MNHN, Paris

memiae
Gastropods described in 1970